Githiga A is a small town in Kenya's Central Province.

Mostly the ethnic population living here are Kikuyu community. They practice small scale farming in various fields like dairy farming, tea growing and 
horticulture.

References 

Populated places in Central Province (Kenya)